Robyn Cowen is a British journalist and football commentator. Cowen is best known as being the lead play by play commentator on BBC One during the England women's national football team matches during UEFA Women's Euro 2022, hosted and won by England.

Early life
Cowen attended Wheatley Park School in Oxford before graduating in 2011 from Oxford Brookes University with a degree in law.

Career
Cowen joined the BBC in 2011 as a sports reporter after a placement at BBC Radio Oxford, She joined BBC Radio 5 Live in 2014 and began on the commentary team for Match of the Day in 2018. She was a commentator for the BBC at the delayed UEFA Euro 2020.  Cowen has had regular appearances on the Offside Rule podcast alongside Lynsey Hooper and Kait Borsay, as well as guest appearances on Guardian Football Weekly, and The Athletic’s Football Cliches show.

Recognition and reception
As a female commentator in a traditionally male dominated industry, Cowen has remarked that whilst Jacqui Oatley had been a solo female voice as the first female commentator on Match of the Day, the presence of Vicki Sparks at the BBC at the same time as Cowen had made her feel "exceptionally lucky" because they had been able to share the "spotlight". 

Former Match of the Day host Des Lynam described Cowen in The Daily Telegraph as having "an understated and light-hearted style [that] is easy on the ear." At the 2021 Football Supporters' Association Awards, Cowen was nominated in the 'Commentator of the Year' category alongside Martin Tyler, Peter Drury, and Conor McNamara, amongst others. 

Cowen’s commentary of "Dream makers. Record breakers. Game changers", as England won Euro 2022 was described by veteran broadcaster Richard Keys as "brilliant. And perfect for the occasion." Cowen’s commentary from the winning moment at the 2022 Euros final was used by BBC One during the New Year's Eve celebrations and fireworks after the Big Ben strikes at midnight into 1 January, 2023.

In February 2023 Cowen was nominated in the Commentator category at the British Sports Journalism Awards.

References

Living people
Alumni of Oxford Brookes University
BBC sports presenters and reporters
English association football commentators
People from Oxford
Year of birth missing (living people)